Tim Rönning (born 15 February 1999) is a Swedish footballer who plays for IF Elfsborg.

References

Living people
1999 births
Association football goalkeepers
Swedish footballers
IF Elfsborg players
Allsvenskan players